Khetlal is an upazila of Joypurhat District in the Division of Rajshahi, Bangladesh. Khetlal Thana was formed in 1847 and it was turned into an upazila on 3 July 1983. Khetlal Municipality was declared on 9 December 2010.

Geography
Khetlal Upazila, having an area of 142.60 km2, is located in between 24°56' and 25°08' north latitudes and in between 89°02' and 89°12' east longitudes. The upazila is bounded by Joypurhat sadar upazila on the north, Akkelpur and Dhupchanchia upazilas on the south, Kalai and Shibganj (Bogura) upazilas on the east, Joypurhat Sadar and Akkelpur  upazilas on the west.

Water bodies Main rivers: Tulsiganga, Harabati.

Demographics
Par the 2001 Bangladesh census, the upazila had a population of 115918 constituting 59274 males, 56644 females, 105728 Muslims, 9981 Hindus, 65 Buddhists, 18 Christians and 126 from other religions. Indigenous communities such as santal and oraon also belong to this upazila.

Administration
Khetlal Upazila is divided into Khetlal Municipality and five union parishads:Alampur, Barail, Baratara, Khetlal, and Mamudpur. The union parishads are subdivided into 88 mauzas and 155 villages.

Khetlal Municipality is subdivided into 9 wards and 9 mahallas.

See also
Upazilas of Bangladesh
Districts of Bangladesh
Divisions of Bangladesh

References 
 Bangladesh Population Census 2001, Bangladesh Bureau of Statistics; Cultural survey report of Khetlal Upazila 2007.

Upazilas of Joypurhat District